Joseph Lobdell (born May 20, 1983) is a former American football offensive tackle. He was signed by the Indianapolis Colts as an undrafted free agent in 2007. He played high school football at Lena-Winslow High School in Lena, Illinois and college football at Northern Iowa.

Lobdell has also been a member of the Kansas City Chiefs.

External links
Indianapolis Colts bio
Kansas City Chiefs bio

1983 births
Living people
People from Monroe, Wisconsin
American football defensive tackles
American football offensive tackles
Northern Iowa Panthers football players
Indianapolis Colts players
Kansas City Chiefs players